The International Skating Union has organised the European Speed Skating Championships for Men since 1893. Unofficial championships were held in the years 1891–1892.

History

Program
 In the years 1891–1892, three distances had to be skated: ⅓ mile (536 m) – 1 mile (1,609 m) – 3 miles (4,828 m).
 In the years 1893–1895, three distances had to be skated: 500 m – 1500 m – 5000 m.
 In the years 1896–1935, four distances had to be skated: 500 m – 1500 m – 5000 m – 10000 m (the big combination).
 In the years 1936–1947, four distances had to be skated: 500 m – 1500 m – 3000 m – 5000 m (the small combination).
 In the years 1948–2017 and subsequent odd years, four distances are skated: 500 m – 1500 m – 5000 m – 10000 m (the big combination).
 Starting in 2017, in odd years, a separate competition with four distances is held: 500 m – 1000 m – 500 m – 1000 m (the sprint combination).
 Starting in 2018, in even years, a single distance championships with seven events will be held: 500 m, 1000 m, 1500 m, 5000 m, team pursuit, mass start, and team sprint.

Note that at the 1967 European Championships in Lahti, Finland, it was so cold that the officials decided that they did not want to expose the skaters to the extreme cold for a long time and so they replaced the 10000 m event with a 3000 m event, in effect using the small combination distances instead of the big combination ones.

Ranking systems used
 In the years 1891–1892, one could only win the European Championships by winning all three distances. If no one won all three distances, no winner would be declared. Silver and bronze medals were not awarded.
 In the years 1893–1907, one could only win the European Championships by winning the majority of the distances, so there would be no European Champion if no skater won at least three distances (two distances in the years 1893–1895, when only three distances were skated). Silver and bronze medals were never awarded.
 In the years 1908–1925, ranking points were awarded (1 point for 1st place, 2 points for 2nd place, and so on); the final ranking was then decided by ordering the skaters by lowest point totals. The rule that a skater winning at least three distances was automatically European Champion was still in effect, though, so the ranking could be affected by that. Silver and bronze medals were awarded now as well.
 In the years 1926–1927, the ranking points on each distance were percentage points, calculated from a skater's time and the current European record time. Apart from that, the system used was the same as in the immediately preceding years.
 Since 1928, the samalog system has been in use.

Medal winners
Numbers in brackets denotes number of victories in corresponding disciplines. Boldface denotes record number of victories.

Unofficial Allround championships

Official Allround championships
Note that from 1936 to 1948, non-European skaters were allowed to participate if they were members of European skating clubs.

Sprint championships

500 metres

1000 metres

1500 metres

5000 metres

Mass start

Team pursuit

Team sprint

All-time medal count

Allround and Sprint Championships (1891–2023)

Unofficial European Championships of 1891, 1892 and 1946 (not recognized by the ISU) included

Single Distance Championships (2018–2022)

Combined all-time medal count (1891–2023)

Unofficial European Championships of 1891, 1892 and 1946 (not recognized by the ISU) included

Multiple medalists
Boldface denotes active skaters and highest medal count among all skaters (including these who not included in these tables) per type.

Allround and Sprint Championships

All events

See also 
 European Speed Skating Championships for Women
 World Allround Speed Skating Championships for Men

References
Footnotes

Medal Winners in European Allround Championships. International Skating Union (2006-04-24). Retrieved on 2007-08-25.

Recurring sporting events established in 1893
All-round speed skating